Jesse Lauriston Livermore (July 26, 1877 – November 28, 1940) was an American stock trader. He is considered a pioneer of day trading and was the basis for the main character of Reminiscences of a Stock Operator, a best-selling book by Edwin Lefèvre. At one time, Livermore was one of the richest people in the world; however, at the time of his suicide, he had liabilities greater than his assets.

In a time when accurate financial statements were rarely published, getting current stock quotes required a large operation, and market manipulation was rampant, Livermore used what is now known as technical analysis as the basis for his trades. His principles, including the effects of emotion on trading, continue to be studied.

Some of Livermore's trades, such as taking short positions before the 1906 San Francisco earthquake and just before the Wall Street Crash of 1929, are legendary within investing circles. Some observers have regarded Livermore as the greatest trader who ever lived, but others have regarded his legacy as a cautionary tale about the risks of leverage to seek large gains rather than a strategy focused on smaller yet more consistent returns.

Early life
Livermore was born in Shrewsbury, Massachusetts, to a poverty-stricken family and moved to Acton, Massachusetts, as a child. Livermore learned to read and write at the age of three-and-a-half. At the age of 14, his father pulled him out of school to help with the farm; however, with his mother's blessing, Livermore ran away from home.

Career

In 1891, at the age of 14, he secured employment, as a board boy, posting stock quotes
at a Boston, Massachusetts branch of Paine Webber stockbrokerage, at the rate of $5 per week. He made his first trade when he bought five shares of Burlington for $5.

In 1892, at the age of 15, he bet $5 on Chicago, Burlington and Quincy Railroad at a bucket shop, a type of establishment that took leveraged bets on stock prices but did not buy or sell the stock. He earned $3.12 on the $5 bet.

From 1893 to 1894, age 16–17, Livermore, nicknamed "The Boy Plunger", was earning about $200 per week, trading at the bucket shops in Boston, much more than his salary at Paine Webber. At the age of 16, he quit his job and began trading full-time. He brought $1,000 home to his mother, who disapproved of his "gambling"; he countered that he was not gambling, but "speculating".

From 1895–1897, age 18–20, he accumulated $10,000 trading profits, a 1,000 per cent net return in three years of trading. However, he was eventually barred by most Boston area bucket shops, because of his consistent winning. Using disguises and false names to trade only prolonged the inevitable city-wide ban.

From 1898–1900, age 21–22, he continued trading with Haight & Freese, the last Boston area bucket shop which had not banned him. However, Haight & Freese gradually widened the bid-ask spread and imposed restrictive margin requirements which made it much more difficult and risky for Livermore to make money.

On September 14, 1900, age 23, he moved to New York, arriving in time for a strong bull market in stocks. He traded successfully, on the long side, at Harris, Hutton & Company stockbrokers, turning $10,000 into $50,000 in five days. In May 1901, he anticipated a correction and went short, using 400% margin. He lost his entire stake, as the ticker tape was not updated fast enough to make current trading decisions. He borrowed $2,000 from Ed Hutton and moved to St. Louis, where he was not known, and went back to betting at bucket shops.

His first big win came in 1901 at the age of 24 when he bought stock in Northern Pacific Railway. He turned $10,000 into $500,000.

In 1906, he vacationed in Palm Beach, Florida, at the club of Edward R. Bradley. While on vacation, at the direction of Thomas W. Lawson, he took a massive short position in Union Pacific Railroad the day before the 1906 San Francisco earthquake, leading to a $250,000 profit. Some time later, Livermore went long on the stock; however, his friend, and owner of the brokerage house in which he did most of his trading, Edward Francis Hutton, erroneously convinced Livermore to close his position, and he wound up losing $40,000.

In the Panic of 1907, Livermore's huge short positions made him $1 million in a single day. However, his mentor, J. P. Morgan, who had bailed out the entire New York Stock Exchange during the crash, requested him to refrain from further short selling. Livermore agreed and instead, profited from the rebound, boosting his net worth to $3 million.

He bought a $200,000 yacht, a rail car, and an apartment on the Upper West Side. He joined exclusive clubs and had mistresses.

In 1908, he listened to Teddy Price, who told him to buy cotton, while Price secretly sold. He went bankrupt but was able to recover all of his losses.

In 1915, he filed bankruptcy again.

Following the end of World War I, Livermore secretly cornered the market in cotton. It was only interception by President Woodrow Wilson, prompted by a call from the United States Secretary of Agriculture, who asked him to the White House for a discussion that stopped his move. He agreed to sell back the cotton at break-even, thus preventing a troublesome rise in the price of cotton. When asked why he had cornered the cotton market, Livermore replied, "To see if I could, Mr. President."

In 1924–1925, he engaged in market manipulation, making $10 million trading wheat and corn in a battle with Arthur W. Cutten and engineering a short squeeze on the stock of Piggly Wiggly.

In early 1929, he amassed huge short positions, using more than 100 stockbrokers to hide what he was doing. By the spring, he was down over $6 million on paper. However, upon the Wall Street Crash of 1929, he netted approximately $100 million. Following a series of newspaper articles declaring him the "Great Bear of Wall Street", he was blamed for the crash by the public and received death threats, leading him to hire an armed bodyguard.

His second divorce in 1932, the non-fatal shooting of his son by his wife in 1935, and a lawsuit from his Russian mistress led to a decline in his mental health, while the creation of the U.S. Securities and Exchange Commission in 1934 imposed new rules that affected his trading. Although it is unknown exactly how it happened, he eventually lost his fortune and filed bankruptcy for the third time in 1934, listing assets of $84,000 and debts of $2.5 million. He was suspended as a member of the Chicago Board of Trade on March 7, 1934.

In 1937, he paid off his $800,000 tax bill.

In 1939, he opened a financial advisory business, selling a technical analysis system.

Personal life
One of Livermore's favorite books was Extraordinary Popular Delusions and the Madness of Crowds, by Charles Mackay, first published in 1841. That was also a favorite book of Bernard Baruch, a stock trader and close friend of Livermore.

He enjoyed fishing and, in 1937, he caught a 486-pound swordfish.

Marriages
Livermore was married three times and had two children. He married his first wife, Netit (Nettie) Jordan, of Indianapolis, at the age of 23 in October 1900. They had only known each other a few weeks before they got married. Less than a year later, he went broke after some bad trades; for a new stake, he asked her to pawn the substantial collection of jewelry he had bought her, but she refused, permanently damaging their relationship. They separated soon thereafter and finally divorced in October 1917.

On December 2, 1918, at the age of 40, Livermore married 22–23-year-old Dorothea (Dorothy) Fox Wendt, a former Ziegfeld girl in Ziegfeld Follies. Livermore had affairs with several of the dancers. The couple had two sons: Jesse Livermore II, born in 1919 and Paul, born in 1922. He then bought an expensive house in Great Neck and let his wife spend as much as she wanted on the furnishings. In 1927, he and his wife were robbed at gunpoint in their home. The relationship became strained by Dorothy's drinking habits, Livermore's affairs with other Ziegfeld girls, and their lavish spending. In 1931, Dorothy Livermore filed for divorce and took up temporary residence in Reno, Nevada, with her new lover, James Walter Longcope. On September 16, 1932, the divorce was granted and she immediately married her boyfriend. She retained custody of their two sons and received a $10 million settlement. Dorothy sold the house in Great Neck, on which Livermore spent $3.5 million, for $222,000. The house was then torn down, depressing Livermore.

On March 28, 1933, Livermore, now 56, married 38-year-old singer and socialite Harriet Metz Noble in Geneva, Illinois. They had met in 1931 in Vienna, where Metz Noble was performing and Livermore was in the audience on vacation. Metz Noble was from a prominent Omaha family that had made a fortune in the Metz Brewery Company. Livermore was Metz Noble's fifth husband; at least two of Metz's previous husbands had committed suicide, including Warren Noble, who hanged himself after the Wall Street Crash of 1929.

Publications
In late 1939, Livermore's son, Jesse Jr., suggested to his father that he write a book about trading. The book, How to Trade in Stocks, was published by Duell, Sloan and Pearce in March 1940. The book did not sell well as World War II was underway and the general interest in the stock market was low. His investment methods were controversial at the time, and the book received mixed reviews upon publication.

Death
On Thanksgiving day, November 28, 1940, just after 5:30 pm, Livermore fatally shot himself with an Automatic Colt Pistol in the cloakroom of The Sherry-Netherland hotel in Manhattan, where he usually had cocktails. Police found a suicide note of eight small handwritten pages in Livermore's personal, leather-bound notebook. The note was addressed to Livermore's wife, Harriet (whom Livermore nicknamed "Nina") and it read, "My dear Nina: Can't help it. Things have been bad with me. I am tired of fighting. Can't carry on any longer. This is the only way out. I am unworthy of your love. I am a failure. I am truly sorry, but this is the only way out for me. Love Laurie".

Further reading
Books about Livermore include:
 1923 – Reminiscences of a Stock Operator, by Edwin Lefèvre. A best-selling semi-fictionalized biography of Livermore though his identity is veiled in the book. Multiple reissues since, the latest issued on January 17, 2006, with a foreword by Roger Lowenstein – PDF
 1985 – Jesse Livermore – Speculator King, by Paul Sarnoff
 2001 – Jesse Livermore: The World's Greatest Stock Trader by Richard Smitten
 2003 – Speculation as a Fine Art, by Dickson G. Watts – PDF
 2004 – Trade Like Jesse Livermore, by Richard Smitten – PDF
 2004 – Lessons from the Greatest Stock Traders of All Time, by John Boik
 2006 – How Legendary Traders Made Millions, by John Boik
 2007 – The Secret of Livermore: Analyzing the Market Key System, by Andras Nagy
 2014 – Jesse Livermore - Boy Plunger, by Tom Rubython, Foreword by Paul Tudor-Jones

References

1877 births
1940 deaths
American financiers
American investors
American money managers
American stock traders
Businesspeople from Massachusetts
Businesspeople from New York City
People from Shrewsbury, Massachusetts
Suicides by firearm in New York City
1940 suicides